Walleshausen station is a railway station in the municipality of Geltendorf, in Bavaria, Germany. It is located on the Mering–Weilheim line of Deutsche Bahn.

Services
 the following services stop at Walleshausen:

References

External links
 
 Walleshausen layout 
 

Railway stations in Bavaria
Buildings and structures in Landsberg (district)